is a railway station on the Tokyu Oimachi Line in southwest Tokyo, Japan, operated by the private railway operator Tokyu Corporation.

Lines
Todoroki Station is served by the Tokyu Oimachi Line. Express services do not stop at this station.

Station layout
The stations has a single ground-level island platform.

Platforms

History
The station opened on November 1, 1929.

Surrounding area
Tokyo City University

References

Railway stations in Tokyo
Railway stations in Japan opened in 1929
Tokyu Oimachi Line
Stations of Tokyu Corporation